Palomar 5 is a globular cluster and a member of the Palomar Globular Clusters group. It was discovered by Walter Baade in 1950, and independently found again by Albert George Wilson in 1955.  After the initial name of Serpens, it was subsequently catalogued as Palomar 5.

There is a process of disruption acting on this cluster because of the gravitation of the Milky Way – in fact there are many stars leaving this cluster in the form of a stellar stream. The stream has a mass of 5000 solar masses and is 30,000 light years long. The cluster is currently  from the Galactic Center.

See also
 List of globular clusters
 List of stellar streams

References

External links
SEDS Palomar 5
 
 

Palomar 05
Palomar 05
09792
Palomar 5 Stream